Janet Bewley may refer to:

Janet Bewley (Wisconsin politician) (born 1951), member of the Wisconsin Legislature
Poppy Cooksey (born 1940), British fencer, previously Janet Bewley Cathie